Underwater World may refer to:
Underwater World, Singapore - oceanarium in Singapore
UnderWater World, Queensland - marine mammal park, oceanarium and wildlife sanctuary in Queensland, Australia
UnderWater World Guam - oceanarium in Guam
Kelly Tarlton's Sea Life Aquarium, formerly Kelly Tarlton's Underwater World - Public aquarium in Auckland, New Zealand
Nanjing Underwater World - aquarium in Nanjing, China
The Aquarium of Western Australia (AQWA), formerly Underwater World, Perth - aquarium in Hillarys, Western Australia
SEA LIFE Minnesota Aquarium - aquarium in Bloomington, Minnesota

In music:
Underwater World, a song by the Finnish glam punk band Hanoi Rocks